Amata ochrospila  is a species of moth of the family Erebidae first described by Alfred Jefferis Turner in 1922. It is found in Australia.

References 

ochrospila
Moths described in 1922
Moths of Australia